Thomas E. Brown (27 March 1897 – ?) was an English professional footballer who played as a half-back in the Football League for Bradford Park Avenue and in non-League football for Rotherham Town.

References

1897 births
Footballers from Sheffield
Date of death unknown
English footballers
Association football midfielders
Bradford (Park Avenue) A.F.C. players
Rotherham Town F.C. (1899) players
English Football League players